Elm Bluff may refer to:
Elm Bluff, Alabama
Elm Bluff Plantation